National liberalism is a variant of liberalism, combining liberal policies and issues with elements of nationalism. Historically, national liberalism has also been used in the same meaning as conservative liberalism (right-liberalism).

A series of "national-liberal" political parties, by ideology or just by name, were especially active in Europe in the 19th century in several national contexts such as Central Europe, the Nordic countries, and Southeastern Europe.

Definitions
National liberalism was primarily a 19th-century ideology and a movement.

National liberal goals were the pursuit of individual and economic freedom and national sovereignty. József Antall, a historian and Christian democrat who served as the first post-communist Prime Minister of Hungary, described national liberalism as "part and parcel of the emergence of the nation state" in 19th-century Europe.

According to Oskar Mulej, "in terms of both ideologies and political party traditions it may be argued that in the Central European lands a distinct type of liberalism, peculiar to this region evolved through the nineteenth century" and citing Maciej Janowski, "the word 'national' acted as more or less synonymous with 'liberal'" ("'national' alone was sufficient to arouse suspicions of liberal associations"). Also according to Mulej, in Southeast Europe "'national liberals' also played visible if not central roles, but with rather different, region-specific characteristics, which to a considerable extent distinguished them from their Central European counterparts."

In his book Up From Conservatism, Michael Lind defines national liberalism in a way that The Progressive describes as matching the historian Arthur M. Schlesinger Jr.'s use of the expression "Vital Center". Lind himself defines national liberalism as uniting "moderate social conservatism with moderate economic liberalism".

Gordon Smith, a leading scholar of comparative European politics, understands national liberalism as a political concept that lost popularity when the success of nationalist movements in creating nation states rendered it no longer necessary to specify that a liberal ideal, party or politician was "national".

History
The roots of national liberalism are to be found in the 19th century, when conservative liberalism and/or classical liberalism was the ideology of the political classes in most European countries and in particular those of Central Europe, then governed by hereditary monarchies.

At their origin, national liberals, although pro-business, were not necessarily advocates of free trade and economic liberalism per se and sometimes favoured cooperation between the government and the national industry, moderate levels of protectionism, the establishment of preferential custom unions, subsidies for infant industry or companies considered of national strategic importance and various forms of industrial planning.

National liberalism was popular in a number of countries including Germany, Austria, Denmark, Sweden, Finland and Romania during the 19th century. In Germany, Austria and Romania, national liberals and/or "National Liberal" parties were long in government. More specifically, in German-speaking countries national liberals were also in favour of a more authoritarian or conservative political regime because of the multi-ethnic character or heterogeneous nature of countries like the Austrian Empire (later officially renamed Austria-Hungary) or the newly created Germany under Chancellor Otto von Bismarck.

Austria
In Austria-Hungary, the Constitutional Party was the main representative of national liberalism. In Austria, national liberalism has remained the basis of one of the three Lager, or ideological camps, in the country, dating back to the Revolutions of 1848 in the Austrian Empire. During the interwar period, the national-liberal camp was gathered into the Greater German People's Party. By 1938, with the Anschluss of Austria into Nazi Germany, the national-liberal camp had been swallowed whole by Austrian National Socialism and all other parties were eventually absorbed into Nazi totalitarianism. Both Socialists and Christian Socials were persecuted under the Nazi regime and the national-liberal camp was scarred after the war due to guilt by association with National Socialism.

In 1949, the Federation of Independents (VdU) was founded as a national-liberal alternative to the main Austrian parties. It incorporated an array of political movements, including free market liberals, populists, former Nazis and German nationalists, all of whom had been unable to join either of the two main parties. The VdU evolved into the Freedom Party of Austria (FPÖ) in 1955–1956. When Jörg Haider was chosen as new FPÖ leader in 1986, the party started an ideological turn towards right-wing populism, which resulted in the split of most liberals, who formed the Liberal Forum (LiF), which took over the FPÖ's membership in the Liberal International and would later eventually merge into NEOS. Haider himself would split from the party and form the Alliance for the Future of Austria in 2005.

Bulgaria 
In Bulgaria the National Liberal Party (NLP) was a political party founded in 1920 by a merger of the Liberal Party (Radoslavists), the People's Liberal Party and the Young Liberals Party. The party has won several seats in some elections including the November 1923 elections and 1927 elections. A party named National Liberal Party 'Stefan Stambolov' was established after the fall of the communist regime, and was part of the Coalition for Bulgaria alliance in the 1991 parliamentary elections.

Czech Republic
In Austria-Hungary the Young Czech Party, emerged in 1874 after a split from the Old Czech Party, was a national-liberal force. During Czechoslovakia's era (1918–1992), a few parties were described as national-liberal: Czechoslovak National Democracy, the National Labour Party and, after 1989, the Czech National Social Party.

Today, the conservative Civic Democratic Party (ODS) in the Czech Republic has been described as a national-liberal party. The ODS is a member of the Alliance of Conservatives and Reformists in Europe, as Slovakia's Freedom and Solidarity, and the International Democrat Union.

Denmark
In Denmark, from the 1830s the core concept of national liberalism was that the nation and the state should have the same extent. National liberals supported the union the Kingdom of Denmark and the Duchy of Schleswig under a common constitutional framework. On the economy, the state should not interfere with trade and the national-liberal economic vision was transposed in the 1857 Law on Freedom of Business, which abolished the last remnants of the feudal monopolies which had previously formed the framework for the craft of the cities. Danish national liberals supported Scandinavism and thus Scandinavian unity.

Finland
In the Grand Duchy of Finland, an autonomous part of the Russian Empire, where as many as 80% of the population was Protestant and Finnish-speaking, somewhat under 20% Protestant Swedish speakers (Sweden ruled Finland until 1809) and a small number Russian Orthodox, the term "national liberal" was used by the elite Swedish-speakers of the Svecoman movement who advocated liberal ideals, but wanted to keep Swedish as the dominant language, an idea opposed by Finnish-speaking nationalists of the Fennoman movement. The Svecoman movement gave birth to the Swedish Party, which was later renamed Swedish People's Party in Finland, which has since moved to mainstream liberalism and social liberalism and is often a party of government in the country.

Germany
In Germany, "national-liberal" was widely used in a similar sense to "right-liberal".

In 19th-century Germany, believers in national liberalism differed from liberal nationalists in that they believed in a more authoritarian presence in Europe and a strong German Empire. Liberal nationalists, such as Max Weber, were looking towards a democratic Germany in cooperation with the other European powers.

At the time of the German Empire, national liberalism was represented by the National Liberal Party (NLP), the largest in the Reichstag for several years. National Liberals supported Bismarck, who served as Chancellor from 1871 (unification of Germany) to 1890, until the late 1870s when the Chancellor reversed his early free trade policies, became a proponent of protectionism, opposed increasing parliamentary powers and ultimately pandered for the support of the German Conservative Party (largely representing the wealthy landowning elite Junkers of Prussia). Additionally, the NLP (which had obtained around 30% in the first three federal elections, including 30.1% in the 1871 federal election) suffered huge losses in the 1878 federal election and especially the 1881 federal election (when it was reduced to 14.6%). Later, the party experienced a steady decline in its share of vote, contextually with the rise of the Social Democratic Party and the Centre Party at the turn of the century.

During the Weimar Republic, the NLP was succeeded by the German People's Party (DVP), whose main leader was Gustav Stresemann, Chancellor (1923) and Minister of Foreign Affairs (1923–1929). The DVP, which was joined by some moderate elements of the Free Conservative Party (FKP) and the Economic Union (WV), was generally thought to represent the interests of the great German industrialists and has been classified as a national-liberal party by several observers. Its platform stressed Christian family values, secular education, lower tariffs, opposition to welfare spending and agrarian subsidies and hostility to "Marxism" (that is to say, both the Communist Party and the Social Democratic Party). After Stresemann's death, the DVP, whose ranks included several anti-republicans, veered sharply to the right.

The current Free Democratic Party (FDP), which was the joint successor of the DVP and the social liberal German Democratic Party (DDP), originally featured conservative and partly nationalist efforts, which were particularly strong in some state associations until the 1950s and more occasionally after that (an interesting example is that of Jürgen Möllemann, FDP leader in North Rhine-Westphalia in 1983–1994 and 1996–2002) and still includes a national-liberal faction, which holds a consistently Eurosceptic position, differently from the rest of the party. Some right-wing elements, including Sven Tritschler (former leader of the Stresemann Club), have more recently joined the Alternative for Germany (AfD), which has in turn been characterised by some observers as national liberal.

Israel
Since 1973, Likud – National Liberal Movement operates in Israel as the main centre-right and Zionist political party in the country.

Romania
In Romania, the National Liberal Party (PNL), which was initially founded in 1875, then re-founded in 1990, and subsequently enlarged in 2014 (when it absorbed the Democratic Liberal Party, PDL), has also been part of the national-liberal tradition.

Nowadays, it is one of the country's two main parties and the first governing force. Incumbent Romanian President Klaus Iohannis stems from it. Currently, in terms of political ideology, the PNL is mainly liberal-conservative and pro-European, therefore placed on the centre-right of the political spectrum concerning economy, society, culture, freedom of expression, and civil liberties.

Russia
In Russia, "national liberalism" was a 1990s movement claiming to be redefining "liberal" principles as understood in the Western tradition to produce a "national liberalism" better suited to Russian culture, being practically a variety of Russian nationalism.

Slovakia
Freedom and Solidarity (SaS), the liberal and libertarian main opposition party after the 2016 parliamentary election in Slovakia, has been shifting from liberalism to Euroscepticism and nationalism and/or combining liberalism and nationalism. As a fact, SaS is not a member of the Alliance of Liberals and Democrats for Europe Party, but of the Alliance of Conservatives and Reformists in Europe, along with conservative and Eurosceptic parties. SaS leader Richard Sulík described himself both as a liberal and as a nationalist, but later corrected himself by saying that he was a liberal and a patriot while condemning chauvinism, racism and religious fanaticism and opposing the withdrawal of Slovakia from the European Union. However, the party has never been classified as national-liberal by third-party sources.

Sweden
In Sweden, in the 1860s liberals described themselves as national liberals (nationalliberaler) and constituted a coalition of monarchists and liberal reformists in support of parliamentary reforms. Swedish national liberals also supported Scandinavism.

Other uses
Several political parties have included "national liberal" in their names or ideology. A list is available at National Liberal Party.

See also
Anti-Japanese sentiment in Korea
Moderate nationalism
Protectionism
Truman Doctrine
Old Right (United States)

Footnotes

References
Verlag Beck, Germany from Napoléon to Bismarck, 1800-1866, Princeton University Press
Lucien Calvié, Unité nationale et liberté politique chez quelques libéraux allemands au début des années 30 and Naissance et évolution du libéralisme allemand, in Françoise Knopper and Gilbert Merlio (edited by), Notices politiques et littéraires sur l'Allemagne, Presses Universitaires du Mirail, Paris, 1835
Alfred Wahl, Les forces politiques en Allemagne, Armand Colin

 
Political ideologies
Political theories
Liberalism
Conservative liberalism
Liberalism in Europe
Liberalism in South Korea
National conservatism
Nationalism in Europe
Conservatism in Europe
Central European culture